Leonard Plukenet (1641–1706) was an English botanist, Royal Professor of Botany and gardener to Queen Mary.

Biography
Plukenet published Phytographia (London, 1691–1696) in four parts in which he described and illustrated rare exotic plants. It is a copiously illustrated work of more than 2 700 figures and is frequently cited in books and papers from the 17th century to the present. He collaborated with John Ray in the second volume of Historia Plantarum (London, 1686–1704). 

Paul Dietrich Giseke (1741–1796) compared Plukenet's species with those of Linnaeus in Index Linnaeanus (Hamburg, 1779).

Pluk. mant., refers to the third volume (London, 1700) of the first edition of Historia Plantarum, the whole of which was published 1691–1705.

Works

Bibliography  
 Phytographia, sive Stirpium Illustriorum & minus cognitarum Icones Tabulis Æenis, Summa diligentiâ elaboratœ, pars prior (1690)
 Phytographia, sive Stirpium Illustriorum & minus cognitarum Icones Tabulis Æenis, Summa diligentiâ elaboratœ, pars altera (1691)
 Phytographia, sive Stirpium Illustriorum & minus cognitarum Icones Tabulis Æenis, Summa diligentiâ elaboratœ, pars tertia (1692)
 Phytographia, sive Stirpium Illustriorum & minus cognitarum Icones Tabulis Æenis, Summa diligentiâ elaboratœ, pars quarta (1696)
 Almagestum Botanicum sive Phytographiæ Plukenetianæ Onomasticon Methodo Syntheticâ digestum (1696)
 Almagesti botanici mantissa. Plantarum novissime detectarum ultra millenarium numerum complectens (1700)
 Amaltheum botanicum. stirpium indicarum alterum copiae cornu millenas ad minimum & bis centum diversas species novas & indictas nominatim comprehendens (1705)

See also 
List of florilegia and botanical codices

References

Further reading 
 Phytographia, sive stirpium illustriorum et minus cognitarum icones, tabulis aeneis summa diligentia elaboratae, quarum unaquaque titulis descriptoriis ex notis suis propriis et characteristicis desumtis insignita, ab aliis ejusdem sortis facile discriminantur, by Leonard Plukenet, London: 1691–1696.
 Codex Bentingiana, the catalog of the garden of Hans Willem Bentinck was a source for the Phytographia

External links 
download Amaltheum Botanicum

17th-century English botanists
1641 births
1706 deaths